Carabodes is a genus of mites belonging to the family Carabodidae.

The genus has almost cosmopolitan distribution.

Species

Species:

Carabodes affinis 
Carabodes agenjoi 
Carabodes andasibe

References

Acariformes